Gary "Chicken" Hirsh (March 9, 1940 – August 17, 2021) was an American drummer, best known for his work with the rock group Country Joe and the Fish.

Hirsh was born in Chicago, Illinois, on March 9, 1940. In December 1966 he replaced John Francis Gunning, but left the band in 1969. He then opened an art supply shop called Abraxas in Oakland, later went to New York, before returning to Berkeley. He is said to be the one who altered the FISH cheer at a concert at New York's Central Park. He also played with the group Blackburn & Snow, and with the Cleanliness and Godliness Skiffle Band. In 1972 he played and recorded with Touchstone, with one of his paintings appearing on the inside of the album. He was latterly an artist, T-shirt manufacturer, and jazz musician living in Ashland, Oregon, and had reunited with the Country Joe Band.

Hirsh was married to Susan L. Solomon in 1968 and they had a son, Tree Adams, and they later divorced.
He went on to become a jazz drummer and painter. He married Terry Rhorer in 1975 and fathered two additional children. He died in Ashland, Oregon, on August 17, 2021, at the age of 81.

References

External links
 Chicken Hirsh's website
 

1940 births
2021 deaths
Musicians from Ashland, Oregon
American rock drummers
Artists from Oregon
Musicians from California
Musicians from the San Francisco Bay Area
Country Joe and the Fish members
20th-century American drummers
American male drummers
20th-century American male musicians